Mount Ollivier is a  mountain in the Canterbury region of New Zealand. The peak is named after mountaineer Arthur Ollivier, who died in 1897.

Mount Ollivier was Sir Edmund Hillary's first major climb, in 1939. After his death in 2008, there was a proposal to rename the peak Mount Hillary as a memorial, a suggestion opposed by Arthur Ollivier's family.

Since the establishment of a tramping track to Mueller Hut, not far below the summit, the peak is now one of the easiest accessible mountains in the park.  The section between Mueller Hut and the summit is a rock scramble rather than a mountain climb.

References

Mountains of Canterbury, New Zealand
Southern Alps